This is a list of individuals who were born and lived in territories located in present-day Ukraine, including ethnic Ukrainians and those of other ethnicities.

Academics

Mathematicians

Selig Brodetsky (1888–1954), British mathematician, President of the Hebrew University of Jerusalem
 Vladimir Drinfeld, Fields medal laureate
 Anatoly Fomenko
 Mark Kac (1914–1984), Jewish, Polish-American mathematician
 Volodymyr Semenovych Korolyuk
 Mykhailo Krawtchouk
 Yakiv Kulik
 Volodymyr Marchenko
Mikhail Ostrogradsky
 Volodymyr Petryshyn
 Platon Poretsky
 Volodymyr Potapiv
 Anatoly Samoilenko
 Oleksandr Mikolaiovich Sharkovsky (1936–2022), most famous for developing Sharkovsky's theorem on the periods of discrete dynamical systems.
 Samuil Shatunovsky (1859–1929), Jewish mathematician
 Anatoliy Skorokhod
 Mykhailo Vashchenko-Zakharchenko (1825–1912), major areas of research included the history of geometry in antiquity and Lobachevskian geometry.
 Ivan Śleszyński (1854–9 March 1931), ethnic Polish Ukrainian mathematician.
 Pavlo Urysohn (1898–1924), Jewish Ukrainian mathematician
 Josif Shtokalo (1897–1987)
 Naum Z. Shor (1937–2006), Jewish Ukrainian mathematician.
 Maryna Viazovska (born 1984), Fields medal laureate, known for her work in sphere packing
 Vadim G. Vizing
 Georgy Voronoy

Physicists/Astronomers
 Gersh Budker, nuclear physicist (Budker Institute of Nuclear Physics)
 Georges Charpak, French physicist (Nobel Prize), born in East Galicia
 Abram Ioffe, prominent Soviet physicist (Ioffe Physico-Technical Institute)
 Isaak Khalatnikiv, BKL conjecture in general relativity
 Leo Palatnik, thin film physics
 Ivan Pulyui, scientist working with cathode radiation
 George Yuri Rainich, mathematical physicist, genius

Geographers/Geologists
 Volodymyr Kubijovyč
 Lubomyr Luciuk, political geographer, community activists
 Vladimir Vernadsky, mineralogist, biochemist

Biologists

 Aleksandr Bogomolets
 Erwin Chargaff
 Theodosius Dobzhansky
 Katherine Esau
 Dmitri Ivanovsky
 Trofim Lysenko
 Oleksandr Palladin
 Kostiantyn Sytnyk
 Vladimir Vernadsky, mineralogist, biochemist

Chemists
 Anatoly Babko
Israel Dostrovsky (1918-2010), Russian (Ukraine)-born Israeli physical chemist, fifth president of the Weizmann Institute of Science
 Ivan Horbachevsky
 George Kistiakowsky
 Lev Pisarzhevsky
 Swiatoslaw Trofimenko
 Volodymyr Vernadsky, mineralogist, biochemist
 Selman Waksman (1888–1973), Jewish, Ukrainian-American, biochemist, Nobel Prize (1952)

Doctors and surgeons

 Nikolai Amosov, heart surgeon
 Alexander Shalimov, surgeon
 Danylo Zabolotny
 Serdyuk Valentin, orthopedic surgeon
 Nicolai L. Volodos, cardiovascular surgeon
 Nikolay Pirogov, inventor of a splint, sling, brace or cast.

Engineers

Volodymyr Chelomey, ballistic missile and Ukrainian spacecraft designer
Valentyn Hlushko, European engineer
Mykola Holonyak, first visible diode
Volodymyr Horbulin, developer of strategic rocket systems and space vehicles of "Kosmos" series
 Sergei Korolev, the father of the Soviet space program, inventor of the first intercontinental ballistic missile and the first space rocket (R-7 Semyorka), creator of the first satellite (Sputnik), supervisor of the first human spaceflight
 Mykola Kybalchich, rocket science pioneer
Yuri Kondratyuk, spaceflight pioneer
Roman Kroitor
Volodymyr Mackiw, mining engineer
Borys Paton
Yevhen Paton, welding engineer
 Igor Sikorsky, aviation pioneer, creator of the first helicopter
Stepan Tymoshenko, father of modern Ukrainian engineering mechanics

Economists
 Mykhailo Tuhan-Baranovsky (1865–1919)
 Eugen Slutsky (1880–1948), Slutsky equation (born in Russian Empire in the territory of Ukraine)
 Ludwig von Mises, founding father of the Ukrainian western-style economics (1881–1973. Born in Austria-Hungary, on the territory of present-day Lviv)
 Bohdan Hawrylyshyn (1926–2016), noted economist, visionary and an economic advisor to the Ukrainian government.

Archeologists

 Vikentiy Khvoyka, discovered Trypillia culture
 Simhah Pinsker (1801–1864), Polish-Jewish archeologist and scholar
 Yuriy Shumovskyi

Historians
 Volodymyr Antonovych, historian and folklorist
 Olena Apanovich
 Volodymyr Barvinok
 Dmytro Doroshenko
 Mykhailo Drahomanov, historian, political emigre and folklorist
 Mykhailo Hrushevsky, historian
 Taras Hunczak
 Myron Korduba
 Mykola Kostomarov, also literary historian, folklorist
 Oleh Kozerod, also political scientist
 Peter Loboda, researcher of ancient Ukrainian numismatics
 George S. N. Luckyj, literary historian
 Mykhailo Maksymovych, also literary historian, folklorist
 Paul Robert Magocsi, chairman of Ukrainian Studies at the University of Toronto
 Oleksander Ohloblyn
 Bohdan Osadchuk, also journalist
 Nataliia Polonska-Vasylenko
 Omeljan Pritsak, orientalist
 Mikołaj Siwicki, historian
 Viktor Suvorov, spy and WWII researcher
 Dmytro Yavornytsky, Cossack historian, archaeologist

Philosophers
 Hryhorii Skovoroda, philosopher, poet and composer

Other academics
 Mykola Andrusiv
 Albert Bandura
 Pavel Petrovich Blonsky
 Olgerd Bochkovsky, sociologist
 Isydore Hlynka
 Robert Klymasz, Ukrainian Canadian folklorist
 Volodymyr Kubiyovych, geographer and encyclopedist
 Viktor Kyrpychov
 Yuri Linnik
 Lubomyr Luciuk, political geographer and community activist
 Anton Makarenko, Ukrainian and Soviet educator
 Joseph Oleskiw
 Wilhelm Reich, psychiatrist and psychoanalyst, pro-Ukrainian freedom dissident
 Otto Struve, Ukrainian-Russian-American astronomer
 Evhen Tsybulenko , professor of international law
 Sergiy Vilkomir, computer scientist
 Fedir Vovk, anthropologist and ethnographer

Arts

Architects
 Ivan Hryhorovych-Barskyi
 Joseph Karakis
 Musa Konsulova
 Marian Peretyatkovich
 Volodymyr Sichynskyi

Fashion Designers
 Natalia Fedner

Painters

Ivan Aivazovsky, painter, famous for his seascapes
Nathan Altman (1889–1970), Ukrainian-Jewish painter and stage designer from Vinnytsia
Marie Bashkirtseff, artist
Robert Brackman
Mykola Burachek
David Burliuk, avant-garde painter, Ukrainian freedom thinker
Volodymyr Burliuk
Louis Choris
Sonia Delaunay, avant-garde artist
Mychajlo Dmytrenko
Aleksandra Ekster, avant-garde artist
Nina Genke-Meller, avant-garde artist
Maurice Gottlieb (1856–1979), Polish-Jewish painter
Leopold Gottlieb (1883–1934), Polish-Jewish painter
Mykola Hlushchenko
Jacques Hnizdovsky
Alla Horska
Alexander Khvostenko-Khvostov, avant-garde stage designer
Pyotr Konchalovsky, painter
Fedir Krychevsky
Vasyl Krychevsky
Arkhip Kuindzhi
Boris Lekar, Israeli painter
Ephraim Moses Lilien, German-Jewish painter
Anton Losenko
 Kazimir Malevich, avant-garde artist
Ivan Marchuk, modern painter
Vadym Meller, avant-garde artist, stage designer
Oleksandr Murashko
Heorhiy Narbut
Solomon Nikritin, painter, avant-garde artist
Nykifor, primitivist painter
Maria Prymachenko
Vlada Ralko, collage artist
Kliment Red'ko, painter, avant-garde artist
Ilya Repin, painter
Bruno Schulz (1892–1942), Polish-Jewish painter and writer
Zinaida Serebriakova, painter
David Shterenberg, painter from Zhytomyr
Volodymyr Sichynskyi, architect, graphic artist
Opanas Slastion, folklorist, designer of modern type of bandura
Anton Solomoukha
Ivan Soshenko, painter
Avigdor Stematsky, Israeli painter from Odessa
Sergei Sviatchenko (born 1952)
Vladimir Tatlin, avant-garde artist
Sonia Terk, avant-garde artist
Mykhailo Turovsky
Roman Turovsky-Savchuk
Mickola Vorokhta, painter
Tetyana Yablonska, modern painter
Yevhen Yehorov, 20th century artist
Vasiliy Yermilov, avant-garde artist
Ivan Yizhakevych

Photographers 
Anatoliy Havrylov, Shevchenko National Prize laureate for cinematography
Nikolai Kozlovsky

Sculptors
 Alexander Archipenko, Ukrainian-American sculptor and graphic artist
 Lina Condes (born 1980), Ukrainian sculptor and multimedia artist 
 Chana Orloff (1888–1968), Ukrainian-Israeli 
 Vladimir Tatlin

Performing arts

Actors/Actresses

 Nick Adams
 Elisabeth Bergner, Austrian-English Jewish actress
 Elina Bystritskaya
 Olena Chekan
 Taissa Farmiga
 Vera Farmiga
 Luba Goy
 John Hodiak
 Milla Jovovich
 Vera Kholodnaya
 Olga Krasko
 Mila Kunis, Ukrainian/American-Jewish actress
 Olga Kurylenko
 Vasily Lanovoy
 Ana Layevska
 Mike Mazurki
 Yaroslava Mosiychuk, actress
 Ivan Mykolaichuk
 Alla Nazimova, (silent film star, born Adelaida Leventon, in Yalta)
 Jack Palance (Volodymyr Palahnyuk)
 Zhanna Prokhorenko
 Ivanna Sakhno
 Yakov Smirnoff
 Anna Sten (Anel Sudakevich)
 Lee Strasberg (1901–1982), Polish/American-Jewish actor
 Stav Strashko, actress and model born in Dnipropetrovsk, Ukraine
 Bohdan Stupka
 Yuriy Tkach
 Katheryn Winnick
 Natasha Yarovenko
 Volodymyr Zelenskyy President of Ukraine (2019–present)

Choreographers and dancers
 Vasyl Avramenko
 Roma Pryma-Bohachevsky, pro-Western
 Oksana Skorik - ballet dancer
 Vasyl Verkhovynets
 Igor Youskevitch - ballet dancer

Film and theatre directors

Roman Balayan, Ukrainian-Armenian film director
Sergei Bondarchuk
Leonid Bykiv
Grigori Chukhrai
Volodymyr Dakhno, Shevchenko National Prize laureate and Cossacks (cartoon series) creator
Alexander Dovzhenko
Edward Dmytryk
 Kateryna Gornostai - Ukrainian LGBTQ film director, screenwriter and film editor 
Les Kurbas
Anatole Litvak (1902–1974), Ukrainian/American-Jewish film director
Danylo Lyder
Paul Mazursky (1930–2014), American-Jewish actor, screenwriter and film director
 Kira Muratova
Larisa Shepitko
Bohdan Stupka
Peter Weibel
Sergei Loznitsa, Ukrainian documentary director
Tanu Muino

Models
 Alina Baikova
 Alexandra Kutas, Ukrainian model who has a disability
 Snejana Onopka, Ukrainian model born in Sievierodonetsk
 Daria Werbowy, Polish-born Canadian model of Ukrainian descent.

LGBT activists and notable LGBT Ukrainians 
 Bogdan Globa -  LGBT activist
 Vitalina Koval - LGBT activist
 Anna Sharyhina - LGBT activist
 Olena Shevchenko - Ukrainian women's and LGBT rights activist

Musicians

Bandurists
 Hnat Khotkevych
 Halyna Korin
 Hryhory Kytasty
 Julian Kytasty
 Volodymyr Luciv
 Victor Mishalow

Composers

Svitlana Azarova
Virko Baley
Vasyl Barvinsky
Maxim Berezovsky
Oleksandr Bilash, composer, Hero of Ukraine
Dmitry Bortniansky
Marusia Churai
Nikolay Diletsky
Isaak Dunayevsky, author of numerous popular Soviet songs
Lesia Dychko
Arkady Filippenko
Reinhold Glière
Leonid Hrabovsky
Semen Hulak-Artemovsky
Volodymyr Ivasyuk
Oleksander Koshetz
Mykola Leontovych, composed Shchedryk (song) also known as Carol of the Bells
Zara Levina
Borys Lyatoshynsky
Mykola Lysenko
Ruslana Lyzhichko
Igor Markevitch
Yuli Meitus
Yuriy Oliynyk
Mykola Ovsianiko-Kulikovsky
Sergei Prokofiev
Levko Revutsky
Nikolai Roslavets
Aleksandr Shymko
Valentin Silvestrov
Myroslav Skoryk
Yevhen Stankovych
Kyrylo Stetsenko
Dimitri Tiomkin - film composer
Roman Turovsky-Savchuk
Artemy Vedel
Mykhailo Verbytsky, composer of the National Anthem of Ukraine
Mykola Vilinsky
Yakiv Yatsynevych

Pianists
 Simon Barere, pianist
 Yevheniya Barvinska, pianist
 Felix Blumenfeld, pianist
 Shura Cherkassky, pianist
 Emil Gilels, pianist
 Vladimir Horowitz, pianist
 Lubka Kolessa, pianist
 Halyna Levytska
 Valentina Lisitsa, pianist
 Benno Moiseiwitsch, pianist
 Heinrich Neuhaus, pianist
 Sviatoslav Richter, pianist
 Leo Sirota, pianist

Organists
 Roman Krasnovsky, organist, composer
 Paul Stetsenko, organist, choral conductor

Strings
 Yuri Bashmet, viola soloist
 Mischa Elman, violinist
 Emanuel Feuermann (1902–1942), Ukrainian-Jewish cellist (born in Austrian Galicia)
 Vadim Gluzman, violinist
 Pawlo Humeniuk, violinist / fiddler
 Leonid Kogan, violinist
 Nathan Milstein, violinist
 David Oistrakh, violinist
 Igor Oistrakh, violinist
 Steven Staryk, violinist
 Isaac Stern (1920–2001), American-Jewish, born in Kremenets Poland (now Ukraine), violinist.

Conductors
 Jascha Horenstein (1898–1973), Ukrainian/American-Jewish conductor
 Oleksander Horilyj (1863-1937), first conductor of the Ukrainian National Symphony Orchestra

Singers

Opera

 Andrij Dobriansky, bass-baritone
 Borys Hmyria, bass
 Vasyl Slipak, baritone
 Alexander Kipnis, bass
 Ivan Kozlovsky, tenor
 Solomiya Krushelnytska, soprano
 Evgeniya Miroshnichenko, soprano
 Vyacheslav Polozov, tenor
 Maria Sokil, soprano
 Anatoly Solovyanenko, tenor
 Leonid Skirko, bass, baritone

Singers and artists of other genres
 Iryna Bilyk - singer
 Denis Stoff, singer 
 Dimal, award-winning artist, rapper, entertainer
 Kvitka Cisyk, singer
 Katya Chilly, singer
 Taras Chubay, bard
 Gaitana
 Ganna Gryniva, jazz singer
 Eugene Hutz, lead singer of the Gypsy Punk band Gogol Bordello
 Jamala, singer, composer, winner of the Eurovision Song Contest 2016
 Iosif Kobzon, iconic Soviet crooner
 Ani Lorak, singer, runner-up of the 2008 Eurovision contest
 Mélovin (Kostyantyn Mykolayovych Bocharov) - Ukrainian singer, LGBT activist
 Ruslana, pop singer, composer, songwriter, conductor, dancer, record producer, pro-Western, singer and winner of the 2004 Eurovision contest.
 Alina Pash - Singer and rapper, LGBT activist
 Anastasia Prikhodko, winner of Star Factory 2007, and represented Russia in the 2009 Eurovision song contest
 Sofia Rotaru, singer
 Anna Sedokova - Singer, actress and television presenter, LGBT activist
 Verka Serduchka (Adriy Danylko), singer and runner-up of the 2007 Eurovision Song Contest
 Yuri Shevchuk, bard, born of Ukrainian father
 Klavdiya Shulzhenko, singer of the most inspiring WWII song that didn't mention Stalin
 Theresa Sokyrka, Canadian Idol 2 runner-up
 Super DJ Dmitri (Dmitry Brill), member of American club/dance group Deee-Lite
 Nissan Spivak, world-famous Ukrainian cantor
 Leonyd Utyosiv, jazz singer
 Svyatoslav Vakarchuk, singer
 Alexander Vertinsky, singer
 Velvel Zbarjer, singer
 Tina Karol, singer
 Vitas, singer and actor
 Oleksandr Ponomaryov, singer
 Vera Brezhneva, singer and television presenter
 Zlata Ognevich, singer, represented Ukraine in the 2013 Eurovision song contest
 Zi Faámelu (born Boris Kruglov) - transgender Ukrainian singer and songwriter

Other
 Volodymyr (Vlad) DeBriansky, guitarist, producer, composer, songwriter
 Eugene Hütz (Gogol Bordello), singer, guitarist, composer, songwriter, actor
 Efim Jourist, composer, accordionist and bajan player
 Ruslana Lyzhichko, pianist, singer, dancer, composer, producer, songwriter
 Leo Ornstein (1895–2002), Ukrainian/American-Jewish composer and pianist.
 Isabelle Rezazadeh, DJ
 George Shakhnevich, accordionist
 Estas Tonne, guitarist

Other performing artists
 Juliya Chernetsky
 Serge Lifar, one of the greatest male ballet dancers of the 20th century
 Maria Guleghina
 Alla Korot
 Olga Khokhlova, ballet dancer, first wife of Pablo Picasso

Literary arts

Writers

Adrian Kashchenko
Aleksandr Solzhenitsyn, Russian writer, had Ukrainian mother
Aleksei Bibik (1878–1976), working-class writer
Oleksandra Marynyna
Amvrosii Metlynsky, poet, writer
Andrey Kurkov, Ukrainian novelist
Bohdan Osadchuk
Chuck Palahniuk, American satirical novelist (Ukrainian father)
Clarice Lispector
Daniil Granin, author
David Bergelson, Ukrainian-Jewish writer in Yiddish language
Hryhorii Epik, writer, journalist
Hryhoriy Skovoroda, poet, writer, philosopher
Ilya Ehrenburg Ukrainian-Jewish publicist and writer in Russian language, born in Kyiv
Ilya Ilf, world-famous Ukrainian humorist in Russian language, co-author of The Twelve Chairs
Irena Karpa, modern Ukrainian writer
Isaac Babel, world-famous Ukrainian-Jewish writer in Russian language, born in Odessa
Ivan Kotlyarevsky, playwright
Ivan Nechuy-Levytsky
Ivan Vahylevych
Jan Potocki, count, world-famous Polish writer in French language, born and died in Ukraine
Joseph Conrad, world-famous Polish writer in the English language, born in Berdychiv
Leopold von Sacher-Masoch, Austrian writer, author of Venus in Furs
Les Podervianskiy, satirist and playwright, pro-Western and pro-Ukrainian dissident
Levko Kopeliv, author and dissident
Markiyan Shashkevych, poet, writer, and interpreter
Marko Cheremshyna, writer
Marko Vovchok
Marya Zaturenska
Mikhail Bulgakov, novelist in Russian language
Mikhail Zhvanetsky, Russian humorist
Miriam Yalan-Shteklis, Israeli writer and poet
Mykhailo Kotsiubynsky
Mykhailo Stelmakh
Mykola Khvylovy
Mykola Kulish, dramatist
Mykola Voronyi
Mykola Zerov
Natalia Vlaschenko, Ukrainian journalist, theatrologist, screenwriter, television presenter, playwright, producer, columnist, publisher and contributing editor
Natan Ilyich Zabara (1908–1975), Ukrainian-Jewish writer in Yiddish
Nikolai Gogol, Ukrainian writer in Russian language, born in Velyki Sorochyntsi
Oksana Zabuzhko, modern Ukrainian novelist, poet, essayist
Oles Honchar, author of The Cathedral
Olha Kobylianska, modernist writer and feminist.
Olha Kobylyanska
Ostap Ortwin (1876–1942), Polish-Jewish journalist and literary critic.
Ostap Vyshnia
Panteleymon Kulish
Pavlo Zahrebelnyi
Raya Dunayevskaya, Marxist philosopher
Sam Honigberg, correspondent for The Billboard and publicist
Shmuel Agnon, world-famous eminent Israeli Hebrew writer, winner of the Nobel Prize (1966), born in Buchach
Sholom Aleichem, world-famous distinguished Ukrainian writer in Yiddish language, born in Pereyaslav
Sofia Yablonska, travel writer, photographer, architect
Stanisław Lem, Polish science-fiction writer born on the present-day territory of Ukraine
Valentyn Rechmedin, writer, journalist
Valerian Pidmohylny, novelist
Vasily Grossman Ukrainian-Jewish, born in Berdichev in 1905.  Dedicated his lives' writing to the three most terrible pages of 20th-century history: the siege of Stalingrad, the Shoah, and the Terror Famine which today is referred to as the Holodomor. Best known for Everything Flows, Life and Fate.
Vasyl Stefanyk
Viktor Nekrasov, writer
Viktor Petrov
Volodymyr Vynnychenko
Yakiv Holovatsky
Yaroslav Halan, anti-fascist playwright and publicist, assassinated by nationalist insurgents.
Yevgeny Grebyonka
Yevgeny Petrov, Ukrainian humorist in Russian language, co-author of The Twelve Chairs
Yevhen Hrebinka
Yevhen Hutsalo
Yuri Andrukhovych, born in Ivano-Frankivsk
Yuri Nikitin, Russian science fiction and fantasy writer
Yuri Nikitin, trampolinist
Yuri Pokalchuk
Maryna and Serhiy Dyachenko - fantasy fiction writers and Shevchenko National Prize laureate

Poets

 Anna Akhmatova, Russian poet
Bohdan-Ihor Antonych
Eduard Bagritsky
Mikola Bazhan
Hayyim Nahman Bialik, modern Hebrew Ukrainian poet, national poet of the State of Israel
 Ivan Drach
Itzik Feffer, Soviet poet in Yiddish language
Moysey Fishbeyn, Ukrainian poet in Yiddish language
Ivan Franko
Alexander Galich, Soviet bard in Russian language, pro-Western dissident
Ihor Kalynets
Mykola Khvylovy
Lina Kostenko
 Andriy Malyshko
 Oleksandr Oles
 Oleh Olzhych
Dmytro Pavlychko
Markiyan Shashkevych
Vasyl Stus
Vasyl Symonenko
Olena Teliha
Pavlo Tychyna
Maksym Rylsky
Taras Shevchenko, founder of modern Ukrainian Literature
 Volodymyr Sosiura
 Vasyl Stus
 Vasyl Symonenko
 Hryhoriy Tiutiunnyk
Lesya Ukrainka
Volodymyr Yaniv
Volodymyr Yavorivsky
Maik Yohansen
Natan Yonatan, Kyiv-born Israeli poet
 Serhiy Zhadan, modern Ukrainian poet and novelist

Business
 Gennadiy Bogolyubov (born 1961/1962), Ukrainian-Israeli billionaire businessman
 Zino Davidoff, founder of Davidoff brand
 Max Levchin, co-founder of PayPal
 Petro Poroshenko, former President of Ukraine
 Jay Pritzker, founder of Hyatt and LGBT philanthropist
 Boris Lohzkin (born 1971), President of the Jewish Confederation of Ukraine and vice-president of the World Jewish Congress
 Harold Willens (1914–2003), Jewish American businessman, political donor and nuclear freeze activist

Astronauts
 Georgy Beregovoy, Soviet cosmonaut No.12, Soviet MP in 1974–89 representing Donetsk region
 Leonid Kizim, Soviet cosmonaut
 Anatoly Levchenko, Soviet cosmonaut
 Anatoly Filipchenko, Soviet cosmonaut 
 Anatoly Artsebarsky, Soviet cosmonaut
 Igor Volk, Soviet cosmonaut
 Pavel Popovich, Soviet cosmonaut No.4, Verkhovna Rada MP in 1964–88, head of Ukrainian diaspora in Moscow
 Georgy Dobrovolsky, Soviet cosmonaut
 Leonid Kadeniuk, earlier a Soviet cosmonaut, made the first manned spaceflight of the National Space Agency of Ukraine
 Yury Onufriyenko, Russian cosmonaut
 Yuri Malenchenko, Russian cosmonaut
 Yuri Gidzenko, Russian cosmonaut
 Heidemarie Stefanyshyn-Piper, NASA
 Bruce E. Melnick, NASA
 Roberta Bondar, Canada's first female astronaut and the first neurologist in space.
 Joshua Kutryk - Canadian astronaut

Cossack Hetmans
 Przecław Lanckoroński (1506–1512), one of the first Hetmans of Ukrainian Cossacks
 Ostap Dashkevych (1514–1535)
 Dmytro Vyshnevetsky (1550–1563)
 Ivan Pidkova (1577–1578), Cossack Hetman and Hospodar of Moldavia
 Kryshtof Kosynsky (1591–1593)
 Hryhory Loboda (1593–1596)
 Severyn Nalyvaiko (1596)
 Petro Konashevych-Sahaidachny (1614–1622), Hetman of Zaporozhian Cossacks
 Mykhailo Doroshenko (1623–1628)
 Hryhoriy Chorny (1628–1630), elected by Registered Cossacks
 Taras Fedorovych (1629–1630), elected by unregistered Cossacks
 Ivan Sulyma (1630–1635)
 Dmytro Hunia (1638)
 Bohdan Khmelnytsky (1648–1657) first Hetman of the Cossack Hetmanate
 Ivan Vyhovsky (1657–1659) second Hetman of the Cossack Hetmanate
 Yurii Khmelnytsky (1659–1663) third Hetman of the Cossack Hetmanate, and (1677–1681 and 1685) in the Right-bank Ukraine
 Pavlo Teteria (1663–1665) in the Right-bank Ukraine
 Ivan Briukhovetsky (1663–1668) in the Left-bank Ukraine
 Petro Doroshenko (1665–1676) in the Right-bank Ukraine and (1668–1669) in the Left-bank Ukraine
 Demian Mnohohrishny (1669–1672) in the Left-bank Ukraine
 Mykhailo Khanenko (1669–1674) in the Right-bank Ukraine
 Ivan Samoylovych (1672–1687) in the Left-bank Ukraine
 Ivan Mazepa (1687–1708) in the Left-bank Ukraine, and (1708–1709) in the Right-bank Ukraine
 Pylyp Orlyk (1710–1742) in exile
 Ivan Skoropadsky (1708–1722) in the Left-bank Ukraine
 Pavlo Polubotok (1722–1724) served as Acting Hetman of the Left-bank Ukraine
 Danylo Apostol (1727–1734) in the Left-bank Ukraine
 Kyrylo Rozumovsky (1750–1764) in the Left-bank Ukraine
 Petro Kalnyshevsky (1765–1775) last Koshovyi Otaman of the Zaporozhian Cossacks

Military figures
 Roman Abraham, general of the Polish Army
 Lyudmila Pavlichenko, Lieutenant of Red Army female sniper
 Luka Basanets, general of the Red Army
 Marko Bezruchko, general of the Ukrainian People's Army
 Taras Bulba-Borovets, otaman of the Ukrainian People's Revolutionary Army aka Polissian Sich
 Ivan Chernyakhovsky, general of the Red Army
 Yakov Dashevsky, general of the Red Army
 Kuzma Derevyanko, general of the Red Army
 Yaakov Dori (1899-1973), Israeli first Chief of Staff of the Israel Defense Forces, President of the Technion – Israel Institute of Technology
 Petro Dyachenko, staff captain of the Russian Army (World War I), colonel of the Ukrainian People's Army (1918–1920), major of the Polish Army (1938–1939), colonel of the Ukrainian Liberation Army (1943–1945), and general of the Ukrainian National Army (1945)
 Nikolay Dyatlenko, interrogator and translator at the Battle of Stalingrad
 Oleksiy Fedorov, major general, partisan leader, subsequently minister of Welfare of Ukraine
 Israel Fisanovich (1914–1944), Ukrainian-Jewish Navy submarine commander Soviet Navy
 Petro Franko, captain of the Air Force of the Ukrainian Galician Army (UHA)
 Nykyfor Hryhoriv, otaman and leader of a Ukrainian insurgent "Green Army"
 Vylhelm Habsburh (Vasyl Vyshyvanyi), Austrian archduke, colonel of the Ukrainian Sich Riflemen
 Andrei Grechko, marshal of the Soviet Union
 Oleksander Hrekov, commander-in-chief of the army of the West Ukrainian National Republic
 Dmytro Hrytsai, general of the Ukrainian Insurgent Army
 Karl Georg Graf Huyn, Austrian colonel general, last governor-general of Galicia (1917–18)
 Alfred Jansa, Austrian major general
 Mykola Kapustiansky, general of the Ukrainian People's Army
 Dmytro Klyachkivsky, colonel and the commander of the Ukrainian Insurgent Army
 Ivan Kozhedub, legendary fighter pilot of WWII, top USSR ace
 Roman Kondratenko, lieutenant general of Russian Imperial Army, defender of Port Arthur during Russo-Japanese war
 Yevhen Konovalets, leader of the Ukrainian Military Organization (UVO) (1920–29) and the Organization of Ukrainian Nationalists (OUN) (1929–38), pro-Western, killed many Jews and Russians
 Filip Konowal, Ukrainian Canadian war hero (Victoria Cross, 1917)
 Petr Koshevoi, marshal of the Soviet Union
 Zenon Kossak, deputy commander of the Carpathian Sich
 Mykhailo Krat, general of the Ukrainian National Army
 Sydir Kovpak, major general, partisan leader, subsequently deputy chairperson of Verkhovna Rada
 Vasyl Kuk, commander of the Ukrainian Insurgent Army
 Grigory Kulik, marshal of the Soviet Union
 Yuriy Lopatynsky, colonel of the Ukrainian Insurgent Army
 Nestor Makhno, commander of "Black Army"
 Alexander Marinesko, legendary Sub Commander in WWII
 Rodion Malinovsky, marshal of the Soviet Union
 Kirill Moskalenko, marshal of the Soviet Union
 Maria Nikiforova, only female commander of an anarchist cavalry detachment, the "Free Combat Druzhina".
 Mykhailo Omelianovych-Pavlenko, general of the Ukrainian Liberation Army, commander of the Ukrainian Galician Army and Ukrainian People's Army
 Ivan Paskevich, field marshal of the Russian imperial army
 Alexander Pechersky, Soviet officer, leader of the Uprising in Sobibor extermination camp (1943)
 Alfred Redl, Austrian counter-intelligence officer
 Jakob Rosenfeld, general of the Chinese People's Liberation Army
 Semyon Rudniev, major general, partisan leader, committed suicide to avoid capture by the Nazi
 Pavlo Shandruk, general of the Ukrainian National Army
 Mykola Shchors, colonel, the Shchors City named after him
 Stanislav Sheptytsky, general of the Polish Army
 Grigori Shtern, general of the Red Army
 Roman Shukhevych, general and the commander-in-chief of the Ukrainian Insurgent Army
 Stepan Shukhevych, otaman of the Ukrainian Sich Riflemen and the Ukrainian Galician Army
 Volodymyr Sinclair, general of the Ukrainian People's Army
 Maksym Skorupsky, commander of the Ukrainian Insurgent Army, pro-Western, killed many Jews and Russians
 Hnat Stefaniv, colonel of the Ukrainian Galician Army
 Roman Sushko, colonel of the Ukrainian Legion
 Semyon Timoshenko, marshal of the Soviet Union, added his native village Furmanivka and other western territories in 1939
 Yurii Tiutiunnyk, general of the Ukrainian People's Army
 Yulia Tolopa - Russian-born volunteer who fought for Ukraine in the Russo-Ukrainian War
 Mykola Tsybulenko, major general
 Pyotr Vershigora, major general, partisan leader, WWII photographer
 Dmytro Vitovsky, colonel of the Ukrainian Galician Army
 Kliment Voroshilov, marshal of the Soviet Union
 Andrei Yeremenko, marshal of the Soviet Union

Intelligence
 Yakov Blumkin
 Jack Childs
 Morris Childs
 Jacob Golos
 Walter Krivitsky
 Genrikh Lyushkov
 Jakob Rudnik
 Nathan Gregory Silvermaster
 Abram Slutsky
 Bohdan Stashynsky
 Manfred Stern
 Pavel Sudoplatov
 Viktor Suvorov
 Richard Yary
 Mark Zborowski

Politicians

Ukrainian non-Soviet politicians

 Dmytro Antonovych, minister of naval affairs, and of arts of the Ukrainian People's Republic (1917–1918 and 1918–1919)
Volodymyr Bahaziy, head of Kyiv City Administration under German occupation (October 1941–January 1942)
Ivan Bahrianyi, president (acting) of the UNR in exile (1965–1967)
Stepan Bandera, leader of the Organization of Ukrainian Nationalists (OUN-B)
Oleksander Barvinsky, leader of the Christian Social Movement in Ukraine
Vyacheslav Chornovil, leader of the People's Movement of Ukraine
Dmytro Dontsov, Ukrainian nationalist writer, publisher, journalist and political thinker
Dmytro Doroshenko, Minister for Foreign Affairs of the Hetmanate (1918)
Sydir Holubovych, Prime Minister of the West Ukrainian National Republic (1919)
Vsevolod Holubovych, Prime Minister of the Ukrainian People's Republic (1918)
Volodymyr Horbulin, Secretary of National Security and Defense Council (1994–1999, 2006)
Oleksandr Horin, Ambassador to the Netherlands 2011-17
Mykhaylo Hrushevsky, President of the Ukrainian People's Republic
Ivan Hrynokh, Vice President of the Ukrainian Supreme Liberation Council
Stepan Klochurak, Prime Minister of the Hutsul Republic (1919)
Yevhen Konovalets, leader of the Organization of Ukrainian Nationalists (1929–1938)
Leonid Kravchuk, President of Ukraine (1991–1994)
Volodymyr Kubiyovych, geographer and politician (Ukrainian Central Committee)
Leonid Kuchma, President of Ukraine (1994–2005)
Mykola Lebed, head of the Security Service for the UPA
 Serhiy Leshchenko - Ukrainian journalist, politician and public figure
Dmytro Levytsky, head of the Ukrainian National Democratic Alliance (UNDO) (1925–1935)
Kost Levytsky, Prime Minister of the West Ukrainian National Republic (1918–1919)
Andriy Livytskyi, President of the Ukrainian People's Republic in exile (1926–1954).
Mykola Livytskyi, President of the Ukrainian People's Republic in exile (1967–1989).
Vyacheslav Lypynsky, leader of the Ukrainian Democratic-Agrarian Party
Nestor Makhno, leader of anarchists
Isaak Mazepa, Prime Minister of the Ukrainian People's Republic (1919–1920 and 1948–1952)
Andriy Melnyk, leader of the Organization of Ukrainian Nationalists (OUN-M)
Volodymyr Ohryzko, Minister for Foreign Affairs (2007–2009)
Symon Petlura, President of the Ukrainian People's Republic
Yevhen Petrushevych, President of the West Ukrainian National Republic
Mykola Plaviuk, President of the Ukrainian People's Republic in exile (1989–1992)
Vyacheslav Prokopovych, Prime Minister of the Ukrainian People's Republic (1920, 1921, 1926–1939)
Lev Rebet, Acting Prime Minister of the Independent Ukrainian Republic (1941)
Pavlo Shandruk, head of the Ukrainian National Committee in Weimar (1945)
Pavlo Skoropadsky, Hetman of Ukraine or head of the Hetmanate (1918)
Yaroslav Stetsko, Prime Minister of the Independent Ukrainian Republic (1941)
Slava Stetsko, leader of the Ukrainian nationalist movement
Kyryl Studynsky, head of the People's Assembly of Western Ukraine (1939)
Borys Tarasyuk, Minister for Foreign Affairs (1998–2000 and 2005–2007)
Serhiy Tihipko, Minister of Economics (2000)
Yulia Tymoshenko, Prime Minister of Ukraine (2007–present)
Anatole Vakhnianyn, leader of the Christian Social Movement in Ukraine
Avhustyn Voloshyn, President of Carpatho-Ukraine (1939)
Volodymyr Vynnychenko, Prime Minister of the Ukrainian People's Republic, writer
Stepan Vytvytskyi, President of the Ukrainian People's Republic in exile (1954–1965)
Nikolaus (Mykola) Wassilko, Ritter von, member of the delegation in Brest-Litowsk, deputy with the rank of a minister at the ZUNR in Vienna (1918–1919), ambassador of Germany and Switzerland (1919–1924)
Volodymyr Yaniv, member of the Ukrainian National Committee in Kraków (1941)
Arseniy Yatsenyuk, Minister for Foreign Affairs (2007), Prime Minister of Ukraine (2014)
Serhiy Yefremov, deputy head of the Central Rada (1917)
Viktor Yushchenko, President of Ukraine (2005–2010)
Viktor Yanukovych, Prime Minister of Ukraine (2002–2004, 2006–2007) and President of Ukraine (2010–2015)

Zionists and Israeli politicians

 Chaim Arlosoroff, Zionist activist, leader of Mapai
 Daniel Auster, first Hebrew mayor of Jerusalem
 Yitzhak Ben-Zvi, historian, Labor Zionist leader, and President of Israel
 Ber Borochov, Zionist activist
 Levi Eshkol, Prime Minister of Israel
 Ahad Ha'am, Zionist activist
 Abba Hushi, mayor of Haifa
 Volodymyr Jabotynsky, Zionist leader, founder of Revisionist Zionism, writer and journalist in Hebrew and Russian language
 Ephraim Katzir, Israeli biophysicist, President of Israel
 Abraham Kaufman, leader of Jewish community in China
 Golda Meir, Prime Minister of Israel
 Leo Motzkin, Zionist activist
 Leon Pinsker, Zionist activist, leader of the Hovevei Zion
 Natan Sharansky, Soviet human rights activist and Israeli politician
 Moshe Sharett, Prime Minister of Israel
 Shevah Weiss, Israeli lawman and Labor Party politician, speaker of the Knesset
 Simon Wiesenthal, hunter of Nazis
 Svitlana Zalishchuk - politician, public leader, journalist, and human rights LGBT campaigner and former member of Ukrainian Parliament

Bolsheviks and Soviet politicians
 Vladimir Antonov-Ovseyenko, Bolshevik leader and diplomat, one of the leaders of the October revolution
 Yevgenia Bosch, Bolshevik politician, People's Secretary of Internal Affairs (1917–1918)
 Leonid Brezhnev, Soviet leader (1964–1982)
 Konstantin Chernenko, Soviet leader (1984–1985), Brezhnev's chief of staff
 Boris Shcherbina, a Soviet politician who served as a vice-chairman of the Council of Ministers from 1984 to 1989. Supervisor of Soviet crisis management during 1986 Chernobyl disaster and the 1988 Armenian earthquake.
 Grigory Petrovsky- Old Bolshevik, participated in signing the Treaty on the Creation of the USSR, one of the officials responsible for implementing Stalin's policies such as collectivization.
 Hryhoriy Hrynko – finance minister of the Soviet Union (1930-1937)
 Vlas Chubar – finance minister of the Soviet Union (1937-1938)
 Yakov Malik, the head of the Africa department of the Soviet ministry of Foreign affairs, Soviet ambassador to the United Kingdom,
 Vitold Fokin, Soviet politician, Central Planning Commission head, first PM after the Independence
 Yakov Gamarnik, Soviet politician
 Serafima Hopner, Bolshevik politician
 Semyon Ignatyev, Soviet politician
 Adolph Joffe, Soviet diplomat
 Lazar Kaganovich, Soviet politician
 Yuriy Kotsiubynsky, Bolshevik politician
 Nikita Khrushchev, Soviet leader (1953–1964), returned Crimea to Ukraine
 Emanuel Kviring, Bolshevik politician
 Anatoly Lunacharsky, first Soviet education minister, Latin alphabet advocate (similar to Atatürk), was sidelined by Stalin
 Solomon Lozovsky, Bolshevik politician
 Dmitry Manuilsky, Bolshevik politician
 Vitaliy Masol, Central Planning Commission head, third PM after the Independence
 Lev Mekhlis, Soviet politician
 Nikolai Podgorny, Chairman of the Presidium of the Supreme Soviet of the USSR (1965–1977), betrayed Khrushchev and later regretted
 Georgy Pyatakov, Bolshevik revolutionary, Trotskyist
 Karl Radek, Bolshevik politician
 Christian Rakovsky, Bolshevik politician
 Vladimir Semichastny, Soviet politician
 Petro Shelest, leader of the Communist Party of Ukraine (1963–1972), betrayed Khrushchev and later regretted
 Mykola Skrypnyk, Bolshevik leader
 Volodymyr Shcherbytsky, leader of the Communist Party of Ukraine (1972–1989), supported Gorbachev and later regretted
 Valentyna Shevchenko, the only female Chairperson of the Presidium of the Verkhovna Rada
 Viktor Taratuta, Bolshevik revolutionary
 Leon Trotsky, leading Bolshevik revolutionary, founder of the Red Army
 Moisei Uritsky, Bolshevik revolutionary
 Volodymyr Zatonsky, Bolshevik politician
 Grigory Zinoviev, Bolshevik revolutionary

Soviet dissidents
 Vyacheslav Chornovil
 Vasily Grossman
 Mykola Horbal
 Petro Hryhorenko
 Vitaliy Kalynychenko
 Ivan Kandyba
 Lev Kopelev
 Sergei Kovalev
 Yaroslav Lesiv
 Eduard Limonov
 Levko Lukyanenko
 Valeriy Marchenko
 Myroslav Marynovych
 Natan Sharansky
 Danylo Shumuk
 Vasyl Stus
 Nadiya Svitlychna
 Yosyf Zisels

Russian politicians
 Alexander Bezborodko – Grand Chancellor of Russian Empire
 Sergei Kiriyenko, prime minister of Russian Federation
 Dmitry Kozak, minister of regional development of Russia
 Valentina Matviyenko, governor of St Petersburg
 Yevgeny Primakov, prime minister of Russian Federation
 Alexey Razumovsky, count of Imperial Russia
 Sergei Storchak, deputy finance minister of Russia
 Yevgeny Yasin, minister of economy of Russian Federation
 Grigory Yavlinsky, liberal economist and leader of the Russian political party "Yabloko".

Polish politicians
 Henryk Józewski, deputy minister of the Ukrainian People's Republic (1920)
 Jan Karaszewicz-Tokarzewski, diplomat (1918–1924)
 Feliks Kon, Bolshevik politician
 Stanislav Kosior, Bolshevik politician
 Herman Lieberman, socialist politician
 Dmitry Manuilsky, Bolshevik politician
 Mieczysław Mickiewicz, minister of the Ukrainian People's Republic (1917–1918)
 Karl Radek, Bolshevik politician
 Adam Daniel Rotfeld, foreign minister of Poland (2005)
 Stanisław Stempowski, minister of the Ukrainian People's Republic (1920–1922)
 Andrey Vyshinsky, foreign minister of the Soviet Union (1949–1953)
 Wanda Wasilewska, communist politician

Austrian politicians
 Archduke Wilhelm of Austria, known as "Prince Vasyl"
 Franz Stadion, Count von Warthausen, Governor of Galicia (1847–1848)

Bulgarian politicians
 Christian Rakovsky, communist politician

Czechoslovak politicians
 František Kriegel, communist politician

German politicians
 Yevgenia Bosch, communist politician
 Emanuel Kwiring, communist politician

Italian politicians
 Angelica Balabanoff, communist politician

American politicians
Kirill Reznik – Maryland State House of Delegates
Herman Toll – former Pennsylvania Congressman
Inna Vernikov - Citycouncilwoman in New York City from Brooklyn

Chinese politicians
 Jakob Rosenfeld

Crimean Tatar politicians
 Noman Çelebicihan
 Ismail Gasprinski
 Mustafa Dzhemilev

Religious leaders and theologians

Orthodox Christian
 Dymytriy (Yarema), Patriarch of the Ukrainian Autocephalous Orthodox Church (1993–2000)
 Hilarion of Kyiv, first native Rus metropolitan of Kyiv (c. 1051–c. 1054)
 John of Tobolsk, Orthodox metropolitan of Tobolsk (1711–1715)
 Mother Maria (Skobtsova), Eastern Orthodox nun, martyr
 Mefodiy (Kudryakov), metropolitan of the Ukrainian Autocephalous Orthodox Church (2000–present)
 Mstyslav (Stepan Skrypnyk), Patriarch of the Ukrainian Autocephalous Orthodox Church (1990–1993)
 Theophan Prokopovich, vice-president of the Orthodox Holy Synod
 Patriarch Volodomyr (Romaniuk), Patriarch of the Ukrainian Orthodox Church of the Kyivan Patriarchate.
 Dmytrij (Danylo Tuptalo) of Rostov, Orthodox saint
 Vasyl (Lypkivsky), first metropolitan of Ukrainian Autocephalous Orthodox Church (1921–1937)
 Stephen Yavorsky, first president of the Orthodox Holy Synod (1721)
 Paisius Velichkovsky, monk, spiritual writer, the founder of modern Eastern Orthodox staretsdom.

Greek Catholic
 Antin Angelovych, first Greek Catholic metropolitan of Lviv (1808–1814)
 Nykyta Budka, first Ukrainian Canadian Greek-Catholic bishop (1912–1927)
 Maxim Hermaniuk, Ukrainian Greek-Catholic Archbishop of Winnipeg (1956–1992)
 Josaphata Hordashevska, Greek Catholic nun (1869–1919)
 Ivan Hrynokh, Greek Catholic priest, professor of the Ukrainian Catholic University in Rome
 Lubomyr Husar, cardinal, head of the Ukrainian Greek Catholic Church (2001–2005), Major Archbishop of Kyiv and Halych (2005–2011)
 Gregory Khomyshyn, Greek Catholic bishop of Stanislav, martyr (1947)
 Josafat Kotsylovsky, Greek Catholic bishop of Peremyshl, martyr (1947)
 Omelyan Kovch, Greek Catholic priest of Peremyshliany, martyr (1944)
 Mykhailo Levitsky, cardinal (1856), Greek Catholic Archbishop of Lviv, Primate of Galicia and Lodomeria (1848–1858)
 Myroslav Ivan Lubachivsky, cardinal, head of the Ukrainian Greek Catholic Church (1984–2000)
 Roman Lysko, Greek Catholic priest, martyr (1949)
 Josyf Veliamyn Rutsky, Greek Catholic metropolitan of Kyiv (1613–1637)
 Yakym Senkivskyi, Greek Catholic priest, martyr (1941)
 Andriy Sheptytsky, head of the Ukrainian Greek Catholic Church, Metropolitan Archbishop of Lviv (1900–1944), political victim of the Soviet Union and was proclaimed as the enemy of the state.
 Klymentiy Sheptytsky, Greek Catholic Exarch of Russia and Siberia (1939), Archimandrite of the Studites (1944), martyr (1951), died in GULAG, victimized by Soviets for being Ukrainian
 Josyf Slipyj, head of the Ukrainian Greek Catholic Church (1944–1984), exited to Siberia and released in xxxx,
 Meletius Smotrytsky, Ruthenian religious activist and author (d. 1633)
 Stefan Soroka, Ukrainian Greek Catholic archbishop of Philadelphia (2000–2018)
 Vasyl Velychkovsky, Greek Catholic bishop (1963–1973)
 Innokentiy Vynnyckyj, first Greek Catholic bishop of Przemyśl (1691–1700)

Roman Catholic
 Andrzej Alojzy Ankwicz, Count, Archbishop of Lviv (1815–33), and Archbishop of Prague (1833–38)
 Eugeniusz Baziak, Archbishop of Lviv and Apostolic Administrator of Cracow (1944–1962)
 Józef Bilczewski, Archbishop of Lviv (1900–1923)
 Marian Jaworski, Cardinal, Archbishop of Lviv (1991–2008)
 Adam Stanisław Krasiński, Bishop of Kamianets-Podilskyi (1757–1798)
 Władysław Aleksander Łubieński, Archbishop of Lviv (1758–1759), Primate of Poland (1759–1767), and Interrex (1763–1764)
 Mieczysław Mokrzycki, Archbishop of Lviv (2008–present)
 Adam Naruszewicz, Titular Bishop of Smolensk (1775–1788), Suffragan Bishop of Lutsk (1788–1790) and Diocesan Bishop of Lutsk (1790–1796)
 Bogusław Radoszewski, Bishop of Kyiv (Latin rite, 1618–1633), Bishop of Lutsk (1633–1638)
 Kajetan Sołtyk, Bishop of Kyiv (1756–1759), then Bishop of Cracow (1759–1788)
 Józef Andrzej Załuski, Bishop of Kyiv (1759–1774)

Jewish
 Jacob Avigdor, last Chief Rabbi of Drohobych
 Moshe Reuven Azman, Chief Rabbi of Ukraine (2005-present)
 Yaakov Dov Bleich, Chief Rabbi of Ukraine and Kyiv (1992–present)
 Solomon Buber, talmudic scholar
 Jacob Frank, Jewish religious reformer who combined Judaism and Christianity
 Zvi Hirsch Chajes, talmudic scholar
 Tzvi Hirsh of Zidichov, Hasidic rabbi
 Israel ben Eliezer, founder of Hasidism
 Malbim, rabbi and preacher
 Nachman of Breslov, Hasidic leader
 Solomon Judah Loeb Rapoport (Shir), rabbi of Ternopil (1837–40) and Prague (1840–67)
 Shalom Rokeach, first Rebbe of Belz (Hasidic dynasty) (1817–55)
 Yehoshua Rokeach, second rebbe of Belz (1857–1894)
 Yissachar Dov Rokeach, the third rebbe of Belz (1894–1926)
 Aharon Rokeach, fourth rebbe of Belz (1926–57)
 Mordechai Rokeach, rabbi, father of the fifth rebbe of Belz
 Sholom Mordechai Schwadron, rabbi
 Yoel Sirkis, great rabbi, one of Achronim
 Naftali Herz Tur-Sinai, Hebrew scholar
 Levi Yitzchok of Berditchev, Hasidic leader
 Israel Zolli, Chief Rabbi of Rome who converted to Roman Catholicism, born in Brody

Others
 Muhammad Asad, Jewish religious writer who converted to Islam, Pakistani diplomat
 Sima Babovich, Hakham of the Crimean Karaite
 Helena Blavatsky, founder of Theosophy
 Olga Dibrova, Ukrainian diplomat
 Abraham Firkovich, leader of the Crimean Karaites
 Seraya Shapshal, chief Hakham of the Crimean Karaite and Lithuanian Karaite communities
 Józef Teodorowicz, Archbishop of Lviv (Armenian rite, 1901–1938)

Sport

Archery
 Tetyana Berezhna, archer
 Nataliya Burdeyna, archer
 Dmytro Hrachov, archer (Olympic bronze – team)
 Kateryna Palekha, archer
 Viktor Ruban, archer (Olympic champion)
 Oleksandr Serdyuk, archer (Olympic bronze – team)

Basketball

 Alexander Belostenny, Olympic medalist
 Viacheslav Kravtsov, basketball player
 Oleksiy "Alex" Len, basketball player drafted 5th by the Phoenix Suns in 2013
 Stanislav Medvedenko, basketball player that won two NBA Finals championships in 2001 and 2002
 Sviatoslav Mykhailiuk, college basketball player of the Kansas Jayhawks
 Igor Nesterenko (born 1990), Israeli-Ukrainian basketball player in the Israel Basketball Premier League
 Oleksiy Pecherov, basketball player selected 18th by the Washington Wizards in 2006
 Vitaly Potapenko, basketball player drafted 12th by the Cleveland Cavaliers in 1996
 Jerome Randle, American-Ukrainian basketball club BC Žalgiris player
 Alexander Volkov, basketball player selected 134th by the Atlanta Hawks in 1986

Boxing
 Vasyl Lomachenko, boxer
 Oleksandr Usyk, boxer
 Taras Bidenko, boxer
 Louis Kaplan ("Kid Kaplan"), boxer, featherweight world champion
 Wladimir Klitschko, boxer champion
 Vitali Klitschko, boxer champion
 Yuriy Nuzhnenko, boxer champion
 Volodymyr Sydorenko, boxer champion
 Volodymyr Virchis, boxer

Chess
 Lev Alburt, Ukrainian Champion (1972, 1973, 1974)
 Izak Aloni, Lviv Champion (1936, 1939)
 Boris Alterman
 Lev Aptekar
 Vladimir Baklan, Ukrainian Champion (1997, 1998)
 Anatoly Bannik, Ukrainian Champion (1945, 1946, 1951, 1955, 1964)
 Alexander Beliavsky, Champion of the USSR (1987, and thrice jointly – 1974, 1980, 1990)
 Ossip Bernstein, All-Russian Sub-Champion (1903)
 Efim Bogoljubow, Champion of the USSR (1924, 1925), FIDE World Champion (1928/29), Challenger for World Championship (1929, 1934)
 Fedor Bohatirchuk, Champion of the USSR (1927 – jointly), Ukrainian Sub-Champion (1924) and Champion (1937), Canadian Sub-Champion (1949)
 Isaac Boleslavsky, Ukrainian Champion (1938, 1939, 1940)
 David Bronstein, Ukrainian Sub-Champion (1940), Champion of the USSR (1948, 1949 – both jointly), Challenger for World Championship (1951),
 Oscar Chajes
 Alexander Chernin, Champion of the USSR (1985 – jointly)
 Josif Dorfman, Champion of the USSR (1977 – jointly)
 Fyodor Duz-Khotimirsky, Kyiv Champion (1900, 1902, 1903, 1906)
 Louis Eisenberg
 Alexander Evensohn, Kyiv Champion (1914)
 Salo Flohr, winner of the 1957 Ukrainian Championship (off contest)
 Maurice Fox
 Henryk Friedman, seven-times Lviv Champion (1926–1934)
 Efim Geller, Ukrainian Champion (1950, 1957, 1958, 1959), Champion of the USSR (1955, 1979)
 Edward Gerstenfeld
 Vitali Golod, Ukrainian Champion (1991)
 Vladimir Grabinsky
 Eduard Gufeld
 Ilya Gurevich
 Mykhailo Gurevich, Ukrainian Champion (1984), Champion of the USSR (1985 – jointly)
 Alexander Huzman
 Vasyl Ivanchuk, Champion of Europe (2004)
 Stefan Izbinsky
 Nicolai Jasnogrodsky
 Abram Khavin, Champion of Western Ukraine (1940), Ukrainian Champion (1954)
 Artur Kogan
 Alexander Konstantinopolsky, Kyiv Champion five consecutive times (1932–1936)
 Irina Krush
 Gennady Kuzmin, Ukrainian Champion (1969, 1989, 1999 – all jointly), Sub-Champion of the USSR (1973)
 Kateryna Lahno
 Konstantin Lerner, Ukrainian Champion (1978, 1982)
 Naum Levin
 Paul List, Odessa Champion (1908)
 Marta Litinskaya-Shul, World Senior Women Chess Champion (2002)
 Isaac Lipnitsky, Ukrainian Champion (1949, 1956)
 Moishe Lowtzky
 Vladimir Malaniuk, Ukrainian Champion (1980, 1981, 1986)
 Adrian Mikhalchishin
 Anna Muzychuk
 Illia Nyzhnyk
 Alexander Onischuk
 Sam Palatnik
 Ruslan Ponomariov, FIDE World Champion (2002)
 Stepan Popel, Champion of Lviv (1930), Western Ukraine (1943 – jointly), Paris (1951, 1953, 1954) and eventually, of the Ukrainians in North America (USA and Canada)
 Ignatz von Popiel, Lviv Sub-Champion (1925)
 Vsevolod Rauzer, Ukrainian Champion (1927, 1933 – jointly)
 Oleg Romanishin, European Junior Champion (1973)
 Jakob Rosanes
 Nicolas Rossolimo
 Iosif Rudakovsky
 Ludmila Rudenko, Women's World Champion (1950–1953)
 Nikoly Rudnev
 Yuri Sakharov, Ukrainian Champion (1966, 1968)
 Vladimir Savon, Ukrainian Champion (1969 – jointly), Champion of the USSR (1971)
 Lidia Semenova
 Alexey Sokolsky, Ukrainian Champion (1947, 1948)
 Victor Soultanbeieff
 Leonid Stein, Ukrainian Champion (1960, 1962), Champion of the USSR (1963, 1965, 1966)
 Mark Taimanov, Champion of the USSR (1956)
 Vladimir Tukmakov, Ukrainian Champion (1970)
 Boris Verlinsky, Ukrainian Champion (1926), Champion of the USSR (1929)
 Yakov Vilner, Ukrainian Champion (1924, 1925, 1928)
 Daniel Yanofsky
 Abram Zamikhovsky, Ukrainian Champion (1931)
 Anna Zatonskih

Fencing

 Yury Gelman (born 1955), Ukrainian-born American Olympic fencing coach 
 Vadim Gutzeit, saber fencer, Olympic champion, Ukraine's Youth and Sport Minister.
 Serhiy Kravchuk, épée fencer, Olympic bronze
 Grigory Kriss, épée fencer, Olympic champion, 2-time silver
Olena Kryvytska (born 1987), 3-time world bronze
 David Tyshler, saber fencer, Olympic bronze
 Yulen Uralov, foil fencer, Olympian
 Iosif Vitebskiy, épée fencer, Olympic silver, 10-time national champion, world champion
 Olga Zhovnir, saber fencer

Figure skating
 Oksana Baiul, figure skater (Olympic gold)
 Oleksii Bychenko (born 1988), Ukrainian-born Israeli figure skater, Olympian 
 Alexei Beletski, Israeli ice dancer, Olympian
 Natalia Gudina, Israeli figure skater, Olympian
 Viktor Petrenko, figure skater (Olympic gold, World Championship gold)
 Aliona Savchenko, German figure skater
 Michael Shmerkin, Israeli figure skater
 Adel Tankova (born 2000), Ukrainian-born Israeli Olympic figure skater

Football (soccer)
 Oleksandr Aliev, footballer
 Igor Belanov, footballer, Ballon d'or (1986)
 Oleg Blokhin, footballer, Ballon d'or (1975)
 Leonid Buryak, footballer, midfielder, Olympic bronze, coach
 Walter Chyzowych, footballer, football coach
 Ivan Getsko, footballer
 Oleksandr Horshkov, footballer
 Timerlan Huseinov, footballer
 Oleg Iachtchouk, footballer
 Yuri Kalitvintsev, footballer
 Serhiy Kandaurov, footballer
 Vitaliy Kosovsky, footballer
 Dema Kovalenko, footballer
Leo Krupnik (born 1979), American-Israeli footballer, football coach
 Viktor Leonenko, footballer
 Yevgeny Levchenko, footballer
 Valeriy Lobanovs'kyi, football coach
 Yevhen Lutsenko, footballer
 Oleh Luzhnyi, footballer
 Dov Markus (born 1946), American-Israeli footballer, born in Ukraine
 Yuri Maximov, footballer
 Artem Milevskyi, footballer
 Volodymyr Mykytyn, footballer
 Serhiy Nazarenko, footballer
 Andriy Oberemko, footballer, midfielder (Illichivets & U21 national team)
 Dmytro Parfenov, footballer
 Yevhen Pokhlebayev, footballer
 Andriy Polunin, footballer
 Serhiy Popov, footballer
 Serhii Rebrov, footballer
 Serhiy Serebrennikov, footballer
 Serhiy Scherbakov, footballer
 Andriy Shevchenko, footballer, Ballon d'or (2004)
 Oleksandr Shovkovskyi, footballer
 Serhiy Skachenko, footballer
 Viktor Skrypnyk, footballer
 Oleh Suslov, footballer
 Oleksandr Holovko, footballer
 Andriy Husin, footballer
 Maksym Kalynychenko, footballer
 Ruslan Rotan, footballer
 Oleg Salenko, footballer
 Hryhoriy Surkis, president of the Football Federation of Ukraine till 2012
 Anatoliy Tymoschuk, footballer
 Vladyslav Vashchuk, footballer
 Andriy Voronin, footballer
 Andriy Yarmolenko, footballer
 Artem Yashkin, footballer
 Serhiy Zeldi, footballer
 Oleksandr Zinchenko, footballer
 Roman Yaremchuk, footballer, striker

Gymnastics
 Anna Bessonova, gymnast
 Iryna Deriugina, gymnast
Artem Dolgopyat (born 1997), Israeli artistic gymnast (second in world championships)
 Maria Gorokhovskaya, gymnast (2 Olympic golds; all-around individual exercises, team combined exercises), 5-time silver (vault, asymmetrical bars, balance beam, floor exercises, team exercises with portable apparatus)
 Tatyana Gutsu, gymnast (Olympic gold)
 Yuri Nikitin, gymnast
 Lilia Podkopayeva, gymnast (Olympic gold)
 Larisa Latynina, gymnast (9 Olympic golds)
 Karina Lykhvar, Israeli Olympic rhythmic gymnast
 Tatiana Lysenko, gymnast, 2-time Olympic champion (balance beam, team combined exercises), bronze (horse vault)
 Kateryna Serebrians'ka, gymnast (Olympic gold)
 Oxana Skaldina, gymnast (Olympic bronze)
 Olexandra Tymoshenko, gymnast (Olympic gold)
 Olena Vitrychenko, Individual Rhythmic Gymnast (Olympic bronze)
 Roman Zozulya, gymnast

Ice hockey
 Ruslan Fedotenko, ice hockey player
 Dmitri Khristich, ice hockey player
 Orest Kindrachuk, ice hockey player
 Eric Nesterenko, ice hockey player
Mikhail Nemirovsky (born 1974), Canadian-German ice hockey player
 Alexei Ponikarovsky, hockey player
 Ivan Pravilov (1963–2012), ice hockey coach, arrested for sexual abuse of teenage student, committed suicide by hanging in prison
 Denis Shvidki, ice hockey player
 Kostiantyn Simchuk, ice hockey player
 Vicky Sunohara, ice hockey player
 Vitaly Vishnevsky, ice hockey player
 Nikolai Zherdev, ice hockey player
 Alexei Zhitnik, ice hockey player

Swimming
 Yana Klochkova, swimmer (4 Olympic golds)
 Lenny Krayzelburg, swimmer (now U.S. citizen); 4-time Olympic champion (100 m backstroke, 200-m backstroke, twice 4x100-m medley relay); 3-time world champion (100 m and 200-m backstroke, 4×100-m medley) and 2-time silver (4×100-m medley, 50-m backstroke); 3 world records (50-, 100-, and 200-m backstroke)
 Maryna Piddubna, Paralympic swimmer
 Maxim Podoprigora, Olympic swimmer

Tennis

 Yulia Beygelzimer, tennis player
 Alona Bondarenko, tennis player
 Kateryna Bondarenko, tennis player
 Gail Brodsky (born 1991), American tennis player
 Olga Fridman (born 1998), Ukrainian-Israeli tennis player
 Julia Glushko (born 1990), Ukrainian-born Israeli tennis player
 Mariya Koryttseva, tennis player
 Viktoriya Kutuzova, tennis player
 Andriy Medvedev, tennis player
 Tatiana Perebiynis, tennis player
 Elina Svitolina, tennis player (winner of 2020 Olympic Bronze Medal Women's Singles)
 Olga Savchuk, tennis player
 Julia Vakulenko, tennis player
 Dayana Yastremska, tennis player
 Maryna Zanevska, tennis player (winner of the 2009 US Open - Girls' Doubles)

Track & field

 Aleksandr Bagach, shot putter
 Valeriy Borzov, sprinter (2 Olympic golds)
 Serhiy Bubka, pole vault legend (Olympic gold), numerous world records
 Vasiliy Bubka, also a pole vaulter, older brother of Sergey/Serhiy
 Hanna Knyazyeva-Minenko (born 1989), Israeli triple jumper and long jumper
 Inessa Kravets, jumper (world record in triple jump)
 Volodymyr Kuts, long-distance runner (2 Olympic golds)
 Serhiy Lebid, long-distance runner (8-time winner of European Cross Country championships)
 Faina Melnik, discus thrower (Olympic gold)
 Zhanna Pintusevych-Blok, sprinter (World Championship gold); world 100-m & 200-m champion
 Olesya Povh, sprinter (Olympic bronze, world bronze)
 Tamara & Irina Press, sister athletes (5 Olympic golds in total)
 Viktoriya Styopina, high jumper
 Viktor Tsybulenko, javelin (Olympic gold, Olympic bronze)

Weightlifting

 Grigory Novak, Olympic silver (middle-heavyweight); world champion
 Igor Rybak, Olympic champion (lightweight)
 Timur Taymazov, world and Olympic records
 Eduard Weitz, Israeli Olympic weightlifter

Wrestling

 Alexander Davidovich, Israeli Olympic wrestler
 Vasyl Fedoryshyn, Olympic silver (freestyle 60 kg); world championship silver & bronze
 Grigory Gamarnik, world champion (Greco-Roman lightweight)
 Samuel Gerson, Olympic silver (freestyle featherweight)
 Boris Michail Gurevich (1937–2020), Olympic champion (freestyle middleweight)
Oleg Ladik (born 1971), Ukrainian-born Canadian Olympic wrestler
 Yakov Punkin, Olympic champion (Greco-Roman featherweight)
 Nik Zagranitchni, Israeli Olympic wrestler

Other athletes

 Vladislav Bykanov (born 1989), Ukrainian-born Israeli Olympic short track speed skater
 Valentina Chepiga (born 1962), IFBB professional bodybuilder
 Olga Danilov (born 1973), Israeli Olympic speed skater
 Fedor Emelianenko, mixed martial arts fighter
Charles Goldenberg (1911–1986), American All-Pro National Football League player
 Leonid Kolumbet, Olympic cycling medalist
 Marina Kravchenko, Soviet and Israel national table tennis teams
 Artur Kyshenko, K-1 kickboxing champion
 Yevhen Lapinsky, Olympic champion volleyball player
 Valentin Mankin, sailor (3 Olympic golds); only sailor in Olympic history to win gold medals in three different classes (yachting: finn class, tempest class, and star class), silver (yachting, tempest class)
 Igor Olshansky, American football player, DL (Miami Dolphins)
 Olyeg Olyeksandrovich Prudius aka Vladimir Kozlov, pro wrestler
 Sergy Rikhter (born 1989), Israeli Olympic sport shooter
 Ian Rubin, Russia national rugby league team
 Vasyl Virastyuk, world's strongest man competition (1st place 2004)
 Igor Vovchanchyn, mixed martial arts fighter
 Yaroslav Vynokur, billiards player (World Champion)

Oligarchs
 Ihor Kolomoyskyi, Ukrainian businessman of Jewish descent
 Gennadiy Korban, Ukrainian businessman of Jewish descent, collector of modern and contemporary art
 Olena Pinchuk, daughter of Ukrainian second president Leonid Kuchma
 Viktor Pinchuk, Jewish-Ukrainian businessman 
 Eduard Prutnik, Ukrainian businessman and politician 
 Rinat Akhmetov, Ukrainian businessman and oligarch
 Dmytro Firtash, Ukrainian businessman and investor

Other
 Peter Adamshock, father of Nick Adams
 Catherine Kutz Adamshock, mother of Nick Adams
 Volodymyr Butkevych, judge
 Markiyan Dimidov, concentration camp survivor 
 Georgiy Gongadze, journalist, civil activist
 Stefan Kiszko, man wrongly convicted of murder in England
 Joseph Oleskiw, early promoter of immigration to Canada
 Anatoly Onoprienko, serial killer
 Roxelana (born Anastassia Lisowska), or Khourrem (Hürrem), Sultan wife of Suleyman the Magnificent
 Leonid Stadnik, unofficially the world's tallest man
 Taras Kulakov (born 1987), born to a Russian mother and Ukrainian father. He is now a citizen of the US.  He rose to internet fame as a YouTube personality known for life hack and gadget reviewing videos.
 Volodymyr Zolkin, YouTuber and activist

See also
 List of Ukrainian rulers
 List of Ukrainian Jews
 List of Galician Jews
 List of Ukrainian Americans
 List of Ukrainian Canadians
 Galicia (Eastern Europe)
 List of people from Galicia (modern period)
 List of people by nationality
 Seven Wonders of Ukraine

References

 
Ukraine